Guia Guanzon Gomez (born April 20, 1942) is a Filipina actress, businesswoman and politician. She is the former mayor of San Juan, having won 75% of total votes during the 2010 elections.  She is known for her previous relationship with former president Joseph Estrada, with whom she has a son, former Senator JV Ejercito.

Early life and education
Guia Gomez was born in Bacolod to Silaynon Doctor Dominador Gomez and Paz Guanzon of Iloilo City.  She was the valedictorian during her elementary years at the University of Negros Occidental - Recoletos (formerly Occidental Negros Institute) and completed her high school studies at the Philippine Women's College in Davao City. She graduated from the Philippine Women's University with a degree in Business Administration and a major in Accounting.

Relationship with Former President Joseph Estrada
While still in college, Guia starred in several films, include Cuatro Cantos (1960), Rancho Grande (1960) and Isang Paa sa Hukay (1958). It was in the film Asiong Salonga, however, that she found romance, eventually falling for her leading man, former President Joseph Estrada. She halted a promising film career in order to finish her college degree and pursue a career in business.

She would later prove instrumental in helping Erap, as the former president is more popularly known, in his political career - as he later ran for mayor of San Juan in 1967. Despite being declared the loser of the election, he appealed the matter all the way to the Supreme Court, which eventually declared him as the true Mayor of San Juan. During his tenure as Mayor of San Juan, she served as his first lady. It was also during this period that their son JV was born.

During her tenure as first lady of San Juan and prior to her own entry to politics, Guia Gomez set-up over thirty of her own businesses in Real Estate, food, and trading. She hold several of these companies together with her son JV.

Mayor of San Juan (2010–2019)

2010 Elections 
In 2009, Guia Gomez declared her intention to replace her son, JV Ejercito as mayor of San Juan. In line with this, she formed her own political party, called Partido Magdiwang.  She serves as president of the party while her son serves as the chairperson.  It is a "San Juan-wide local political party with offices and chapters in majority of its barangays local wide."

She later won in a landslide, with over 42,000 votes, approximately 75% of the total vote.  Later on, she said the reason that she is mayor now is because her son had many projects including the completion of the PUP San Juan Campus and the completion of the new San Juan City Hall which she wanted to see finished.

Awards and Programs
During her tenure as Mayor, San Juan was recognized by the Department of Interior and Local Government as the Top Highly Urbanized City in the country in terms of governance for 2011. It was the second ranked in the country in 2010. Mayor Gomez mentions that this is due to her 7K program - Kalinisan (Cleanliness), Katahimikan (Peace), Kaunlaran (Progress), Kalusugan (Health), Kalikasan (Environment), and Kalinga sa Pamilya (Family Welfare). The latter two Ks were added by her, building on the 5Ks initially started by her son.

One of her most important programs, together with architect Jun Palafox is the transformation of San Juan into a vertical green city, with "elevated sidewalks, monorail, high-rises and greenery". This is in response to the danger of floods in the city.

2013 Elections 

Guia Gomez ran for re-election as mayor of San Juan. She won against Reynaldo San Pascual and Glenn Angeles.

2016 elections
On September 30, 2015, she decided to run again for the mayoralty position. Gomez will seek her 3rd and final term as the City Mayor as she will facing Vice Mayor Francis Zamora. She will run together with her niece of former President Joseph Estrada, Jana Ejercito for congresswoman and Jinggoy Estrada's daughter, Janella for Vice Mayor. She narrowly won re-election against Zamora. She finished her last term as mayor on June 30, 2019

Other Organizations
Mayor Gomez currently serves as the president of Balikatan sa Kaunlaran (BSK) Movement, an NGO created by the National Commission on the Role of Filipino Women (NCRFW) dedicated to "uplifting the quality of life of women and their families". It has since evolved into an organization supporting livelihood programs and training for female entrepreneurs including the creation of Christmas decorations and dolls.

References

1942 births
Living people
People from San Juan, Metro Manila
People from Bacolod
Philippine Women's University alumni
Pwersa ng Masang Pilipino politicians
Actresses from Negros Occidental
Filipino actor-politicians
Mayors of San Juan, Metro Manila
Visayan people